The first season of the television comedy Portlandia premiered on IFC in the United States from January 21 to February 25, 2011 for six episodes.

Cast

Main cast
 Fred Armisen as Fred, Peter, Candace , Jason
 Carrie Brownstein as Carrie, Nance, Toni, Melanie

Special guest cast
 Kyle MacLachlan as Mr. Mayor

Guest stars
 Steve Buscemi as Book Store Customer
 Jason Sudeikis as Aliki
 Aubrey Plaza as Book Store Customer and Beth
 Sam Adams as Mayor's Assistant
 Aimee Mann as herself
 Sarah McLachlan as herself
 Edie McClurg as Mayor's Secretary
 Kumail Nanjiani as Cell Phone Salesman
 Selma Blair as Frannie Walker
 Jenny Conlee, Colin Meloy, James Mercer and Corin Tucker as Echo Echo
 Gus Van Sant as himself
 Heather Graham as herself
 Nick Kroll as Daniel Prison
 Nick Kroll as Baseball Player (uncredited)

Episodes

References

External links 

 

Portlandia (TV series)
2011 American television seasons